The Children's Museum of History, Natural History & Science, better known as the Utica Children's Museum was founded on August 1, 1963, and is housed in a historic building located in the heart of Utica's downtown Bagg's Square district. The Museum offers approximately 60 exhibits and experiences throughout four floors of mostly interactive exhibits play space and is a hands-on, interactive museum.

History
The museum was originally called the "Junior Museum of Oneida County" and housed in the basement of the Utica Public Library. In 1979, the museum moved to its current location at 311 Main Street.
It was moved several times before finding its current home in the John C. Hieber Building, a historic commercial building listed on the National Register of Historic Places.

References

External links
 UticaCM.org

Museums established in 1963
Utica, New York
Museums in Oneida County, New York
Children's museums in New York (state)